Senator Dunlap may refer to:

Henry M. Dunlap (1853–1938), Illinois State Senate
John F. Dunlap (born 1922), California State Senate
Robert P. Dunlap (1794–1859), Maine State Senate
William B. Dunlap (fl. 1870s–1890s), Pennsylvania State Senate
William Claiborne Dunlap (1798–1872), Tennessee State Senate